When the Wind Blows is a 1982 graphic novel, by British artist Raymond Briggs, that shows a nuclear attack on Britain by the Soviet Union from the viewpoint of a retired couple, Jim and Hilda Bloggs. The book was later made into an animated film.

Plot
The book follows the story of the Bloggs, a couple previously seen in the book Gentleman Jim. One afternoon, the couple hears a message on the radio about an "outbreak of hostilities" in three days time. Jim immediately starts construction of a fallout shelter (in accordance with a government-issued Protect and Survive brochure, which he has collected from a public library), while the two reminisce about the Second World War. Their reminiscences are used both for comic effect and to show how the geopolitical situation has changed, but also how nostalgia has blotted out the horrors of war. A constant theme is Jim's optimistic outlook and his unshakeable belief that the government knows what is best and has the situation under full control, coupled with Hilda's attempts to carry on life as normal.

During their preparations the action is interrupted by two-page dark illustrations. With the first being a nuclear missile on a launch pad, labelled "MEANWHILE, ON A DISTANT PLAIN....", the second a squadron of Warthogs, labelled "MEANWHILE, IN THE DISTANT SKY....", and third a nuclear submarine labelled "MEANWHILE, IN A DISTANT OCEAN...."

The Bloggs soon hear of enemy missiles heading towards England and make it into their shelter before a nuclear explosion. They spend all the first day within the fallout shelter, on the second day however, they start suffering from aches and pains in their bodies and still feeling tired, hinting that they have already started being exposed to radiation and start moving about the house, exposing themselves to more radioactive fallout. Undaunted, they try to continue life as normal, as if it was the Second World War again. They find the house to be in shambles, with both the water and the electricity cut off. On the third day, misreading advice given in government leaflets, they come to believe that they must stay in the fallout shelter for just two days rather than two weeks. Thus, they go outside, to find that their garden and likely the whole area, has essentially been reduced to a wasteland with dead trees and grass in their garden, and that there is no sounds such as the trains that would usually be running, Hilda also thinks that the bomb has caused nice weather, as the day is bright, hot and near-cloudless (different from the nuclear winter seen in the film). While out, they notice the smell of cooking meat, unaware that it comes from the burning corpses of their neighbours.

Jim and Hilda exhibit considerable confusion regarding the serious nature of what has happened after the nuclear attack; this generates gentle comedy as well as darker elements: amongst them, their obliviousness of the fact that they are probably the only people left of their acquaintance. For instance, they repeatedly state that they should go out and purchase supplies. As the novel progresses and their emergency water supply runs out, they resort to collecting rainwater. Though they are wise to boil it, it is still contaminated with radiation, and thus their situation becomes steadily more hopeless, beginning to suffer more effects of radiation sickness. At first they suffer headaches and shivering, moments after the bomb. Then, from the second day, Hilda suffers from vomiting and diarrhoea. On the fourth day, Hilda's gums begin to bleed, and she finds blood in her diarrhoea, which they mistake for haemorrhoids. On the fifth day, Jim also shows bleeding gums; both are suffering blue bruising but mistake these for varicose veins. Finally, Hilda's hair begins to fall out. From then on, she insists that they go back into the fallout shelter and wait for help to arrive (though it never does).

The book ends on a bleak night, when Hilda insists Jim, who has now lost the last of his optimism, should pray; he begins uttering phrases from Psalm 23, which pleases Hilda. However, forgetting the lines, he switches to The Charge of the Light Brigade, whose militaristic and ironic undertones distress the dying Hilda, who weakly asks him not to continue. Finally, James's voice mumbles away into silence as he finishes the line, "...rode the Six Hundred..."

The paper potato sacks they have wrapped themselves in then darken, in line with their ebb of consciousness, growing debility and ultimate deaths. This is then followed by the final blank white page.

Adaptations

Film 

The book was made into an animated film by director Jimmy Murakami in 1986. The couple are voiced by Sir John Mills and Dame Peggy Ashcroft. The soundtrack consists of songs, many with an anti-nuclear theme, by prominent rock musicians and groups, including Roger Waters, Genesis and David Bowie.

Radio 

There was also a BBC Radio 4 dramatisation in 1983, with the voices of Peter Sallis and Brenda Bruce, directed by John Tydeman. The programme won the Broadcasting Press Guild award for the most outstanding radio programme of 1983.

Stage 
A stage version, created at around the same time, has been performed several times since.

Other appearances

The book was mentioned in UK parliamentary discussions, and used to support unilateral disarmament.
"Mothers Talk", a 1984 song by the British pop group Tears for Fears was partly influenced by the book:
 "The song stems from two ideas. One is something that mothers say to their children about pulling faces. They say the child will stay like that when the wind changes. The other idea is inspired by [...] When The Wind Blows" —Roland Orzabal
 Licensed images from When the Wind Blows appear in the short book Sussex After the Bomb – What Will Happen to Newhaven, Lewes, The Ouse Valley, Seaford, Eastbourne and Brighton published by The Profession for Peace (1984).
 The lyrics to the Mansun B-side track When The Wind Blows are based on the graphic novel.
 The Iron Maiden song "When the Wild Wind Blows" from their 2010 album The Final Frontier is loosely based on the graphic novel. In the song, however, the couple commit suicide thinking the tremors shaking up their hideout is the nuclear Doomsday they had been expecting. They are found like this by a rescue team going through the ruins after what was 'merely' a strong earthquake, on "just another day the wild wind blows".

Critique of preparations for nuclear war
  
The two pamphlets mentioned in When the Wind Blows are based on actual public information series such as Protect and Survive. These sort of pamphlets go back as far as 1938, when the British government put out a leaflet, The Protection of Your Home Against Air Raids. It was updated after the Second World War to Advising the Householder on Protection against Nuclear Attack which was originally published in 1963, around the time of the Cuban Missile Crisis. Protect and Survive was published in 1980, shortly before Briggs began work on When the Wind Blows.

Many of James and Hilda's preparations came directly from the pamphlets:
Page 10 of Protect and Survive provided James with the directions for making the lean-to using doors to protect from radiation.
Page 14 of Advising the Householder demonstrated how whitewashing windows reduces fire damage by reflecting the heat from the nuclear blast.
Page 16 of Protect & Survive illustrated a box of sand for dishwashing.

Briggs was not the only one to criticise the pamphlets about preparation for nuclear war. One of the best-known critiques was E. P. Thompson's anti-nuclear paper, Protest and Survive, playing off the Protect and Survive series.

Criticisms like Protest and Survive point out the inadequacies of the preparation procedures posed by the pamphlet Protect and Survive. In contrast, by the comic format or graphic novel genre, Briggs is able to depict a more realistic account of the effects of nuclear attack on civilians, like James and Hilda. In When the Wind Blows, James makes reference to the bombing of Hiroshima and uses his knowledge of that event to infer what could happen to him and Hilda and to make sense of his own experience before and after the nuclear attack. Unlike the nuclear preparation pamphlets, Briggs's depictions of James and Hilda's experience with radiation sickness actually align with real accounts.

References

1982 graphic novels
1982 comics debuts
British graphic novels
Novels by Raymond Briggs
Picture books by Raymond Briggs
Novels set during World War III
British comics adapted into films
British novels adapted into films
Hamish Hamilton books